The Ambitious Slave; Or, A Generous Revenge is a 1694 tragedy by the English writer Elkanah Settle. It was first staged at the Theatre Royal, Drury Lane by the United Company.

The original cast included John Bowman as King of Persia, John Verbruggen as Tygranes, George Powell as Orontes, John Freeman as Briomar, Jane Rogers as Mirvan, Frances Maria Knight as Herminia, Anne Bracegirdle as Clarismunda, Elizabeth Barry as Celestina and Elinor Leigh as Rosalin.

References

Bibliography
 Van Lennep, W. The London Stage, 1660-1800: Volume One, 1660-1700. Southern Illinois University Press, 1960.

1694 plays
West End plays
Tragedy plays
Plays by Elkanah Settle